Tourism in France directly contributed 79.8 billion euros to gross domestic product (GDP) in 2013, 30% of which comes from international visitors and 70% from domestic tourism spending. The total contribution of travel and tourism represents 9.7% of GDP and supports 2.9 million jobs (10.9% of employment) in the country. Tourism contributes significantly to the balance of payments.

France was visited by 89 million foreign tourists in 2019; however, with 137 million foreign overnight stays, it is the fourth most visited country in the world.

France has 45 sites inscribed in the UNESCO's World Heritage List and features cities or sites of high cultural interest (Paris being the foremost, but also Loire Valley, Toulouse, Strasbourg, Bordeaux, Lyon and others), beaches and seaside resorts, ski resorts, as well as rural regions that many enjoy for their beauty and tranquility (green tourism). Small and picturesque French villages of quality heritage (such as Collonges-la-Rouge, Locronan, or Montsoreau) are promoted through the association Les Plus Beaux Villages de France (literally "The Most Beautiful Villages of France"). The "Remarkable Gardens" label is a list of the over two hundred gardens classified by the Ministry of Culture. This label is intended to protect and promote remarkable gardens and parks.

Statistics

Most tourists arriving to France in 2018 came from the following countries or territories:

Number of stays

In 2019, tourists from the following countries spent the most nights in France:

Countries issuing tourism in France

Nordic countries

A total of 2 million Nordic tourists visited France during 2016. 300,000 came from Finland, 360,000 from Norway, 540,000 from Denmark and 800,000 from Sweden.
Tourism from the Nordic countries to France is promising, and by 2022 the number of Nordic tourists is expected to grow by 14%

Touristic regions

Paris 

Paris, the capital city of France, is the third most visited city in the world.

It has some of the world's largest and renowned museums, including the Louvre, which is the most visited art museum in the world, but also the Musée d'Orsay which, like the nearby Musée de l'Orangerie, is mostly devoted to impressionism, and Centre Georges Pompidou, dedicated to Contemporary art.

Paris hosts some of the world's most recognizable landmarks such as the Eiffel Tower, which is the most-visited paid monument in the world, the Arc de Triomphe, the cathedral of Notre-Dame, or the Sacré-Cœur on Montmartre. The Cité des Sciences et de l'Industrie, located in Parc de la Villette, is the biggest science museum in Europe. Near Paris are located the Palace of Versailles, the former palace of the Kings of France, now a museum, and the medieval village of Provins. Both attractions are protected as UNESCO World Heritage Sites.

French Riviera 

With more than 10 million tourists a year, the French Riviera (French: Côte d'Azur), in Southeastern France, is the second leading tourist destination in the country, after the Parisian region.

According to the Côte d'Azur Economic Development Agency, it benefits from 300 days of sunshine per year,  of coastline and beaches, 18 golf courses and 3,000 restaurants. Each year the Côte d'Azur hosts 50% of the world's superyacht fleet, with 90% of all superyachts visiting the region's coast at least once in their lifetime.

Main cities on the French Riviera include Nice, Antibes and Cannes; Cap Ferrat is also a popular destination. Cannes hosts the annual Cannes Film Festival. Tourists often visit Port-Cros National Park, east of Toulon, as well as the city-state of Monaco, famous for its Monte Carlo Casino, near the Italian border.

Provence 

A large part of Provence, with Marseille as its leading city, was designed as the 2013 European Capital of Culture. Numerous famous natural sites can be found in the region, as the Gorges du Verdon, the Camargue, the Calanques National Park and the typical landscape of Luberon. Provence hosts dozens of renowned historical sites like the Pont du Gard, the Arles' Roman Monuments or the Palais des Papes in Avignon. Several smaller cities also attracts a lot of tourists, like Aix-en-Provence, La Ciotat or Cassis, on the Mediterranean Sea coastline.

Loire Valley 

Another major destination are the Châteaux (castles) of the Loire Valley. The French Revolution saw a number of the great French châteaux destroyed and many ransacked, their treasures stolen. The overnight impoverishment of many of the deposed nobility, usually after one of its members lost his or her head to the guillotine, saw many châteaux demolished.

During World War I and World War II, some chateaux were commandeered as military headquarters. Some of these continued to be used this way after the end of the Second World War.

This World Heritage Site is noteworthy for the quality of its architectural heritage, in its historic towns such as Amboise, Angers, Blois, Chinon, Orléans, and Saumur, but in particular for its castles, such as the Châteaux d'Amboise, de Chambord, d'Ussé, de Villandry, de Chenonceau and de Montsoreau, which illustrate to an exceptional degree the ideals of the French Renaissance.

French Alps 

The French Alps are the portions of the Alps mountain range that stand within France, located in the Rhône-Alpes and Provence-Alpes-Côte d'Azur regions. While some of the ranges of the French Alps are entirely in France, others, such as the Mont Blanc massif, are shared with Switzerland and Italy.

More than 20 skiing resorts make it a popular destination among Europeans in the winter.

Corsica 

Corsica is the fourth largest island in the Mediterranean Sea after Sicily, Sardinia and Cyprus. It is a popular attraction for tourists with both cultural aspects (with its main cities Ajaccio and Bastia and smaller towns like Porto-Vecchio and Sartène) and geographical features (Parc naturel régional de Corse).

The Calanques de Piana and Scandola Nature Reserve are listed on the UNESCO World Heritage List.

Mountains comprise two-thirds of the island, forming a single chain. Forests make up 20% of the island.

other tourist attractions 

 Panthéon
 Sacré-Coeur
 Palais des Tuileries
 Cimetière du Père-Lachaise
 Palais du Luxembourg
 Centre Georges-Pompidou
 Place de la Concorde

Notable places

Cities 

France has many cities of cultural interest, some of them are classified as "Town of Art and History" by the French Ministry of Culture. All major cities in France are worth seeing since they all have cultural and historic attributes.

Villages 

Les Plus Beaux Villages de France (English: "The most beautiful villages of France") is an independent association, created in 1982, that aims to promote small and picturesque French villages of quality heritage. As of 2008, 152 villages in France have been labelled as the "Plus Beaux Villages de France".

There are a few criteria before entering the association: the population of the village must not exceed 2,000 inhabitants, there must be at least two protected areas (picturesque or legendary sites, or sites of scientific, artistic or historic interest), and the decision to apply must be taken by the municipal council.

Specific destinations

Religious sites 
France attracts many religious pilgrims along the Way of St. James, or to Lourdes, a town in the Hautes-Pyrénées that hosts a few million visitors a year. The Taizé Community has become one of the world's most important sites of Christian pilgrimage. Over 100,000 young people from around the world make pilgrimages to Taizé each year for prayer, Bible study, sharing, and communal work.

Theme parks 

Disneyland Paris is France's and Europe's most popular theme park, with 15,405,000 combined visitors to the resort's Disneyland Park and Walt Disney Studios Park in 2009.  In 2019, the park attracted over 9.7 million visitors, more than the Eiffel Tower, the Louvre, or the Palace of Versailles. The historical theme park Puy du Fou in Vendée is the second most visited park of France. Other popular theme parks are the Futuroscope of Poitiers, Vulcania in Auvergne-Rhône-Alpes and the Parc Astérix near Paris.

Most popular tourist attractions 
The most popular tourist sites include (visitors per year):

Notre-Dame de Paris (13.6 million)
Basilique du Sacré-Coeur (10.5 million)
Louvre Museum (8.5 million)
Eiffel Tower (6.2 million)
Palace of Versailles (6 million)
Centre Pompidou (3.6 million)
Musée d'Orsay (2.9 million)
Musée du quai Branly (1.3 million)
Arc de Triomphe (1.2 million)
Mont Saint-Michel (1 million)
Notre-Dame de la Garde (800,000)
Château de Chambord (711,000)
Sainte-Chapelle (683,000)
Metz Cathedral (652,000)
Bastille of Grenoble (600 000)
Centre Pompidou-Metz (550,000)
Château du Haut-Kœnigsbourg (549,000)
Puy de Dôme (500,000)
Musée Picasso (441,000)
Carcassonne (362,000)

Gallery

See also 

List of museums in France
List of castles in France
List of cathedrals in France
List of basilicas in France
List of medieval bridges in France
List of spa towns in France
List of ski resorts in France
List of World Heritage Sites in France
National parks of France
Regional natural parks of France
 Clipperton Island
 French Guiana
 French Polynesia
 French Southern and Antarctic Lands
 Adélie Land
 Crozet Islands
 Île Amsterdam
 Île Saint-Paul
 Kerguelen Islands
 Scattered Islands in the Indian Ocean
 Guadeloupe
 Martinique
 Mayotte
 New Caledonia
 Réunion
 Saint Barthélemy
 Saint Martin
 Saint Pierre and Miquelon
 Wallis and Futuna

References

Further reading
 Bauer, Michel. "Cultural tourism in France." in Cultural tourism in Europe (1996): 147–164.
 Cawley, Mary, Jean-Bernard Marsat, and Desmond A. Gillmor. "Promoting integrated rural tourism: comparative perspectives on institutional networking in France and Ireland." Tourism Geographies 9.4 (2007): 405–420.
 Clarke, Alan. "Coastal development in France: Tourism as a tool for regional development." Annals of Tourism Research 8.3 (1981): 447–461.
 Corne, Aurélie. "Benchmarking and tourism efficiency in France." Tourism Management 51 (2015): 91–95.
 Cró, Susana, and António Miguel Martins. "Foreign Direct Investment in the tourism sector: The case of France." Tourism Management Perspectives 33 (2020): 100614. online
 d'Hauteserre, Anne-Marie. "The role of the French state: Shifting from supporting large tourism projects like Disneyland Paris to a diffusely forceful presence." Current Issues in Tourism 4.2-4 (2001): 121–150. online
 Eade, John. "Pilgrimage and tourism at Lourdes, France." Annals of Tourism Research 19.1 (1992): 18-32 online.
 Endy, Christopher. Cold war holidays: American tourism in France (U of North Carolina Press, 2004).
 Frochot, Isabelle. "Wine tourism in France: a paradox?." in Wine tourism around the world (2009): 67–80.
 Furlough, Ellen. "Making mass vacations: tourism and consumer culture in France, 1930s to 1970s." Comparative Studies in Society and History 40.2 (1998): 247-286  online.
 Gay, Jean-Christophe. "Why is tourism doing poorly in overseas France?" Annals of Tourism Research 39.3 (2012): 1634–1652. online
 Gordon, Bertram M. War Tourism. Second World War France from Defeat and Occupation to the Creation of Heritage (Cornell UP, 2018. ISBN) online review
 Harp, Stephen L. Au naturel: Naturism, nudism, and tourism in twentieth-century France (LSU Press, 2014).
 Lamont, Matthew, and Jim McKay. "Intimations of postmodernity in sports tourism at the Tour de France." Journal of Sport & Tourism 17.4 (2012): 313–331.
 Pickel-Chevalier, Sylvine. "Can equestrian tourism be a solution for sustainable tourism development in France?." Loisir et Société/Society and Leisure 38.1 (2015): 110–134. online
 Seraphin, Hugues, et al. "Tourism education in France and sustainable development goal 4 (quality education)." Worldwide Hospitality and Tourism Themes (2021).
 Seraphin, Hugues. "Terrorism and tourism in France: the limitations of dark tourism." Worldwide Hospitality and Tourism Themes 9.2 (2017): 187–195. online
 Young, Patrick. Enacting Brittany: Tourism and culture in provincial France, 1871–1939 (Routledge, 2017).

External links 

 france diplomacy website Guidance of tourist

 
 French Government Tourist Office 
 About-France.com - Tourism and general information about France,
 Tourist Gite information in Dordogne,
 France Tourist Information

 
France